Julio Isamit Díaz (born 18 August 1989) is a Chilean politician and lawyer. In 2006, he was part of the Pingüino Movement (2006).

He was named Minister of National Assets on 28 October 2019 amid the 2019–20 social crisis («Estallido Social»).

His surname is of Arab Maltese origin.

References

External links
 

1989 births
Living people
Chilean people of Maltese descent
Instituto Nacional General José Miguel Carrera alumni
Pontifical Catholic University of Chile alumni
21st-century Chilean politicians
Independent Democratic Union politicians
People from Santiago
Government ministers of Chile